South Carolina Highway 58 (SC 58) is a  state highway in the U.S. state of South Carolina. The highway connects the Lynchburg area with Turbeville, via Shiloh. Though it is designated an east-west highway, it runs north-south.

Route description
SC 58 begins at an intersection with SC 341 (Lynchburg Highway) just southeast of Lynchburg, within Lee County. It travels on a fairly southern direction, enters Sumter County, and has an intersection with SC 53. The highways travel concurrently to the east and have an interchange with Interstate 95 (I-95) on the northwestern edge of Shiloh. Approximately  later, SC 53 splits off toward the northeast, while SC 58 enters Shiloh proper. Upon leaving the city limits of Shiloh, the highway enters Clarendon County. It curves to the southeast and enters Turbeville. There, it meets its eastern terminus, and intersection with U.S. Route 301 (US 301)/US 378 (Main Street). Here, the roadway continues as Gamble Street.

Major intersections

See also

References

External links

SC 58 at Virginia Highways' South Carolina Highways Annex

058
Transportation in Lee County, South Carolina
Transportation in Sumter County, South Carolina
Transportation in Clarendon County, South Carolina